Cradle Song may refer to:

Lullaby

Literature
 "A Cradle Song", a poem of William Blake written 1791-92, set to music in 1947 by Benjamin Britten in his song cycle A Charm of Lullabies
 "A Cradle Song" (W. B. Yeats poem)
 Cradle Song, a 2003 detective novel by Robert Edric

Film
 Cradle Song (1933 film), Paramount Pictures film starring Dorothea Wieck, Evelyn Venable and Guy Standing
Cradle Song (1953 film), a Mexican film
 Cradle Song (1960 film), a release on Hallmark Hall of Fame starring Judith Anderson, Evelyn Varden and Siobhan McKenna
 Cradle Song (1994 film), Spanish film

Music

Albums
Cradle Song (album), a 1993 album by cellist Julian Lloyd Webber
Cradlesong (album), a 2009 album by Rob Thomas
"Cradle Song" by Iamthemorning from the album " Counting The Ghosts"

Classical
Wiegenlied (Brahms) or Cradle Song, a lied for voice and piano by Johannes Brahms
Cradle Song, for organ by Herbert Sumsion
"Cradle Song", carol by Richard Causton
 An adaptation of the tune for "Sweet Afton", also used sometimes for the song "Away in a Manger"
"Cradle Song", a 1922 song by Muriel Herbert
"Cradle Song", List of compositions by Modest Mussorgsky
"Cradle Song", Gordon Jacob

See also 
 Canción de cuna (disambiguation)